= Independent Division of Shanxi Provincial Military District (2nd Formation) =

2nd Independent Division of Hebei Provincial Military District (1966-69) Independent Division of Shanxi Provincial Military District (1969–76)
- Active: 1966.7 - 1976.9
- Country: People's Republic of China
- Branch: People's Liberation Army
- Type: Division
- Role: Infantry

2nd Independent Division of Hebei Provincial Military District (Chinese: 河北省军区独立第2师) was formed in July 1966 from the Public Security Contingent of Hebei province. The division was composed of five regiments (7th to 11th).

In February 1969 it moved to Shanxi province and became the second formation of Independent Division of Shanxi Provincial Military District(Chinese: 辽宁省军区独立师) with all but 8th Infantry Regiments. The 8th Infantry became 4th Infantry Regiment, Independent Division of Hebei Provincial Military District.

The 7th, 9th, 10th and 11th Infantry Regiments were renamed as 1st, 2nd, 3rd, 4th Infantry Regiments of the division.

In September 1976 the division was disbanded.
